Period Stuff is a collection of short stories by the English author Dornford Yates (Cecil William Mercer). Some were written in 1939 but not published in book form until 1942. Some of the tales had originally appeared in The Windsor Magazine and others in The Strand Magazine.

Chapters

References

Bibliography
 

1942 short story collections
Ward, Lock & Co. books
Short story collections by Dornford Yates